Daniel Jooste (born 21 February 1998) is a South African rugby union player for the  in Super Rugby Unlocked. His regular position is hooker.

References

External links
 

South African rugby union players
Living people
1998 births
Rugby union hookers
Sharks (rugby union) players
Western Province (rugby union) players
South Africa Under-20 international rugby union players
Stormers players
Sharks (Currie Cup) players